Zhang Decheng or Chang De-Cheng (1846 – late-July 1900) was a Chinese nationalist and leader of the Fists of Harmony and Justice during the Boxer Uprising. Though working as a boatman during his youth, he would spend much of the Boxer Rebellion as a leader of the group he created, the Fists of Harmony and Justice.

Biography 
Born in either Zhaozhang or Goucun village in the Zhili Province of the Qing Dynasty, Zhang would spend much of his youth as a boatman along the Daqing, Ziya, and other rivers in Zhili.

As time went on and foreign contacts in Northern China increased, particularly the actions of western missionaries, Zhang and other similar-minded individuals would set out to "destroy foreigners". Though the Fists of Harmony and Justice did exist during the mid-1890s, they proved only to be a minor inconvenience to any official Qing or foreign affairs due to the group's small size, lack of influence, and mostly local actions taken by bands of around 50 men each. In 1899, a compatriot of Zhang, Zhao Sandu set out to establish order in the Fists of Harmony and Justice's ranks during a conference at the Yaoli Yaowang Temple in Wangkou. Both Zhang Decheng and Cao Futian would develop the creation of the First Heavenly Regiment, along with the structure of their organisation, which was as follows:

Though central structure for the organisation was formed, the group relied on a system of small groups of men under local leaders, which was to be replaced (in some capacity) by the new First Heavenly Regiment. And for this new group that was created, Zhang required more members for his group, which was done by trying to convince Boxer followers that he had magical abilities. He supposedly hid a knife in the ground, somewhere in Tianjin, and then claimed that this place was "dangerous". His followers then dug up the area and found the knife, and were convinced that Zhang did indeed possess supernatural powers. In early 1900, he proclaimed himself "Number One Boxer" and said he had a mandate from the gods. He led at that time several thousand followers.

In early June 1900, Zhang Decheng went to see the Viceroy of Zhili, Yu Lu 裕禄. He presented himself to him as the founder of the Boxer movement, and the viceroy promised to provide the Boxers with money and equipment.

For many, he was considered as the supreme Boxer leader.

References 

Chinese nationalists
Qing dynasty rebels
19th-century Chinese people
Chinese people of the Boxer Rebellion
1846 births
1900 deaths